The 2010 Honda Grand Prix of St. Petersburg was the second race of the 2010 IZOD IndyCar Series season. The race took place on March 29, on the  temporary street circuit in St. Petersburg, Florida, and was telecast by ESPN2 in the United States. The event was due to take place on March 28 and telecast on ABC, but was postponed by series officials due to safety concerns after torrential rain fell on the circuit.

Report

Background

Practice and qualifying

Race
On the day of the race, torrential rain fell on the circuit, and the series officials decided to postpone the race to the next day as they deemed the track to be too wet.

The race started as scheduled on Monday, however due to earlier rain, there were damp patches in certain areas of the track. Will Power, the polesitter and the winner of the opening race in São Paulo led the field ahead of Marco Andretti. Further down the field, both Mike Conway and Dario Franchitti ran on to the damp patches and spun in different areas of the race track, bringing out the caution. Franchitti suffered light contact with the wall and had to be refired, but was able to stay on the lead lap with no major damage to his car.

The race went green on the fourth lap, and Andretti did not take too long to take the lead from Power, who struggled for tyre temperature and quickly dropped to fourth place. Andretti only led for one lap before surrendering the lead to Scott Dixon, who passed him into turn 1. As the stint progressed, Will Power began to find pace and was back into second by lap 19, whereas Andretti had dropped to fourth behind Power's Penske teammate, Hélio Castroneves. The second caution of the race came out at one-quarter distance when Takuma Sato, running in ninth place, outbraked himself into turn 3 and buried himself in the tyres, and negated the 7 second lead which Scott Dixon had built over his pursuers.

During this caution, the race leaders made their first pitstops of the day whereas some drivers further down the field stayed out. Vítor Meira took the lead ahead of Raphael Matos and Dario Franchitti, with Dixon in ninth place. When the track went green, Meira comfortably held on to the lead, with most of the action occurring mid-pack as the drivers who had pitted under the caution sought to make their way up the field on new tyres. Mario Moraes and Dixon came together in turn 1 while battling for 7th, which left Dixon with a damaged front wing and Moraes with a flat tire. Both drivers had to pit at the end of the lap for repairs and rejoined at the tail of the field, along with Marco Andretti who had to pit for a flat tire after collecting debris.

Meira, Matos and Franchitti all pitted within ten laps after the green flag was waved, and Ryan Briscoe took the lead on lap 41. He was followed by Hideki Mutoh, but the Japanese driver soon came under attack from Hélio Castroneves, the first of the drivers who had pitted under the second caution. On lap 47, Dan Wheldon, who was running just outside the top ten suffered a suspension failure at turn 1 which sent his car straight into that of Mario Moraesin front of him. Both drivers were unhurt but this resulted in the third caution of the race coming out. The lead trio of Briscoe, Mutoh and Castroneves were among the drivers who decided to pit, and Will Power who was running fourth stayed out and took the lead. Power comfortably led at the restart, and set about building a gap to the cars of Justin Wilson and E. J. Viso who were running second and third. The man on the move was Scott Dixon, who in two green laps had moved from eighth to fourth and was soon pressuring third-placed Viso. Dixon's Ganassi teammate Franchitti however found himself at the tail of the field again after having to pit for a flat tire.

On lap 65, Castroneves made a move on countryman Raphael Matos at turn 3. The move pushed Matos wide, and Mike Conway attempted to follow Castroneves through, however his car was not fully ahead of Matos's and they touched at turn 4, with Conway ending up in the wall and a full course caution being called. With 34 laps left, the entire field took the opportunity to come in under yellow and fill their cars with fuel to the end. The only exception was Vitor Meira, as he had yet to use the red-walled soft compound tires, and the A. J. Foyt team believed that the tyres would not last for a long stint. Meira thus led ahead of Viso (who had pitted just before the caution), Power, Wilson and Briscoe who had moved up 4 spots on pit lane.

Meira led for four laps after the green came out before being forced to make his final stop. Viso took the lead but immediately slowed with the gearbox problem and dropped way back, eventually having to pit for repairs and rejoining three laps down. Will Power thus found himself back in the lead ahead of Wilson, Briscoe and Dixon. Dixon did not last much longer, as he crashed into the outside wall after clipping the inside wall with his right rear tire at turn 5 and the caution came out again.

A five-lap period under caution eased any fuel worries anyone had, and once the track went green, Power led the field again. Unlike the previous occasion, he was unable to build a large gap to the second-placed car of Wilson. Briscoe and Castroneves kept a watching brief on the two leaders, and behind them Dario Franchitti was on the charge, passing cars one after the other. At the front, Justin Wilson was able to keep Power honest but never got close enough to make an overtaking move, and the Australian crossed the line to make it two wins out of two. Wilson was second ahead of Power's two teammates, Briscoe and Castroneves. Franchitti's late race charge took him to fifth place having passed Tagliani with three laps left. Danica Patrick, despite being on the red tires in the last stint finished seventh ahead of Matos, Graham Rahal and Tony Kanaan.

Classification

Qualifying
 All cars were split into two groups of twelve, with the fastest six from each group going through to the "top 12" session. In this session, the fastest six cars progressed to the "Firestone Fast Six". The fastest driver in the final session claimed pole, with the rest of the cars lining up in session order, regardless of qualifying times. (fast six from 1–6, top 12 from 7–12 and round 1 from 13–24, with group 1 drivers occupying the odd–numbered grid positions, and group 2 drivers occupying the even–numbered grid positions.

Race

Championship standings after the race
Drivers' Championship standings

 Note: Only the top five positions are included.

References

External links 

Grand Prix of St. Petersburg
Honda Grand Prix of St. Petersburg
Honda Grand Prix of St. Petersburg
21st century in St. Petersburg, Florida
Honda Grand Prix of St. Petersburg